Christensenidrilus is a genus of annelids belonging to the family Enchytraeidae.

Species:
 Christensenidrilus blocki (Dózsa-Farkas & Convey, 1997)

References

Annelids